The 2004 Desafio Corona season was the first season of stock car racing in Mexico. The serial was presented in March as Desafío Corona. After 14 races Carlos Pardo of Equipo Telcel was declared champion.

Cars
Pontiac Grand Am was the car used for almost drivers. Only two Dodge Stratus, both of Seeman-Baker team, was used. Pontiac won 13 of 14 runs and the championship.

Teams and drivers

Full time entries

Part time entries

Schedule

Results

Races

1. Qualifying cancelled by rain.
2. Qualifying cancelled by works in the track.

Standings

Notes

References

Desafio Corona season

NASCAR Mexico Series